The Kiurikian or Kiurikid dynasty ( or more rarely Gurgenian) was a medieval Armenian royal dynasty which ruled the kingdoms of Tashir-Dzoraget (978-1118) and Kakheti-Hereti (1029/1038-1105). They originated as a junior branch and vassals of the Bagratid dynasty, but outlived the main branch of the dynasty after the fall of the Bagratid Kingdom of Armenia. They became vassals of the Seljuk Turks in the second half of the 1060s. After the fall of the Kingdom of Tashir-Dzoraget to the Seljuks in the early 12th century, members of the dynasty continued to rule from their fortresses of Tavush, Matsnaberd and Nor Berd until the 13th century.

History

The Kiurikian dynasty and the Kingdom of Tashir-Dzoraget (also known as the Kingdom of Lori) were founded by Kiurike (a variation of the name Gurgen), youngest son of the Bagratid king of Armenia Ashot III the Merciful.

Information about Kiurike I is very scarce. It is known that in 974 he participated in the mobilization of Armenian troops initiated by his father Ashot III, during the time of Byzantine Emperor John Tzimiskes' campaign in Asia Minor, which posed a threat to the southern borders of Armenia. Kiurike received the title of "King of Tashir-Dzoraget", in the northern part of the Bagratid Kingdom of Armenia, after the death of his father in 977. He continued work on the construction of the monastic complexes of Sanahin and Haghpat, as evidenced by his donation to the Sanahin monastery of two large and luxurious chandeliers. He also participated in the campaign of his brother King Smbat II against the King of Abkhazia Bagrat II (who later ruled Georgia as Bagrat III), in defense of the ruler of Tao David III.

After the death of Smbat II under dubious circumstances, Kiurike's middle brother Gagik I ascended to the throne. Gagik reaffirmed his younger brother Kiurike's royal rights on the condition of loyalty to the new king. The last time Kiurike is mentioned in the primary sources is in 991. According to an unnamed 12th-century chronicler, Kiurike ruled for 10 years (which is consistent with the dating of his coronation to 981 by the historian Mekhitar of Ayrivank). Described as an extremely devout man, he abdicated the throne of in favor of his son David I and devoted the last 8 years of his life to spiritual matters at Sanahin Monastery.

The kingdom of the Kiurikians reached its highest peak under David I the Landless (r. 989–1048) and his son Kiurike II (r. 1048–1089)․ David's activities are recorded in the Universal History of the 11th century Armenian historian Stepanos Asoghik. As a result of his successful wars against the neighboring emirates of Tiflis (Tbilisi) and Ganja, David significantly expanded the boundaries of his kingdom. In the mid-990s, he annexed Dmanisi, defeated the emir of Tiflis Ali ibn Jafar in battle and forced the latter to accept the Kiurikians' suzerainty. With this victory, David strengthened the security of the northern borders of the Armenian kingdom.

Before 1001, David faced another threat, this time from the southeast, namely the Emirate of Ganja, where the Kurdish Shaddadid dynasty was established in the 970s. Especially under Emir Fadl I (r. 985–1031), the emirate tried to prevent the further rise of the Kiurikid kingdom. However, when Fadl I attacked David, apparently off the banks of the Kura River, he suffered a heavy defeat and fled from the battlefield. David, though unable to build on this victory and expand the boundaries of his kingdom, temporarily eliminated the threat posed by the Emir of Ganja.
 
After that, David had to pacify a rebellion by his vassal Demetre, lord of the fortress of Gag (Gaga Berd). The latter renounced the Armenian Church and converted to Chalcedonism, apparently with the aim of enlisting the support of Georgia and gaining independence from the Kiurikids. In addition, Demetre appointed his son, who had also converted to Chalcedonianism, as Archbishop of Tashir at Hnevank Monastery. David suppressed the rebellion of the prince and deprived him of Gaga Berd and all his other possessions.

In 1001, David made an unsuccessful attempt to achieve complete independence from the Bagratid Kingdom of Armenia, which was brutally suppressed by his uncle King Gagik I.  David lost almost all of his possessions (for which he was nicknamed "the Landless") and was able to regain them only after recognizing the supremacy of the king in Ani.

For the next two decades, nothing concrete is known about David's activities. During this period he was likely busy strengthening the defenses of his kingdom, which resulted in the founding of the fortress of Lori (which would later become the capital of the kingdom) and 12 other fortresses. Based on these extension construction projects, it can be assumed that this was the period of economic prosperity for the Kingdom of Tashir-Dzoraget.

In the first years of the reign of the Georgian king Bagrat IV (10271072), the Emir of Ganja Fadlun I made an attempt to seize the entire territory of the Kura river valley, including the city of Tifilis. All the Armenian and Georgian feudal possessions that were adjacent to the Emirate of Ganja were in danger. In the face of common danger, a military coalition arose consisting of Bagrat IV, David I the Landless, Liparit IV of Kldekari, Eristavi Ivane Abazasdze, King of Kakheti-Hereti Kvirike III, as well as the Emir of Tiflis Jafar. In 1031, the allied troops campaigned against the Ganja Emirate, invaded Shirvan and, defeating the troops of Emir Fadlun near the Ekletsi River, forced the latter to flee and captured significant loot.

David I married the sister of the last king of the Kingdom of Kakheti-Hereti kingdom from the Arevmaneli dynasty, Kvirike III. Kvirike had no sons, and therefore he appointed as his heir his nephew Gagik, the son of his sister Zorakrtsel and David Landless. Around 1029/1038, Gagik ascended to the throne, founding a new branch of the Kiurikid dynasty, who ruled the united kingdom of Kakheti and Hereti until 1105, when these lands were conquered by Georgia.

The transition of Kakheti-Hereti to the zone of influence of the Tashir-Dzoraget kingdom was negatively perceived by the Georgian king Bagrat IV, who was striving for the unification of Georgia, and led to the deepening of the confrontation between the Kiurikids and the Georgian Bagrationis. As a result, when the Shaddadid Emir of Dvin Abu'l-Aswar invaded Tashir-Dzoraget with a large army in 1040 and captured a significant part of the kingdom within a year, Bagrat IV did not rush to the aid of David the Landless.

The extreme inequality of forces forced David to abandon the idea to single-handedly fight the emir, and he turned to his suzerain, Hovhannes-Smbat III of Armenia, for help. Since the Hovhannes-Smbat initially did not intervene in the conflict, David his suzerain that if he did not help him, then David would obey Abu'l-Aswar and together with him would attack Shirak, where the capital of the Kingdom of Armenia Ani was located. Consequently Hovhannes-Smbat send David an auxiliary army and also pushed his other vassal, Smbat of Syunik, to do the same. Using the same method, David obtained help from Bagrat IV, who also sent him an auxiliary army. With the help of his allies, David defeated Abu'l-Aswar and liberated all his possessions occupied by the emir.

After the death of King Hovhannes-Smbat, David twice, in 1041 and 1042, tried to seize the capital of Armenia, Ani, and take the Armenian throne, but to no avail. The throne was inherited by the nephew of Hovhannes-Smbat, Gagik II. However, in 1045 both Gagik and Ani were captured by the Byzantines. With the fall of the unified Armenian kingdom and the senior branch of the Bagratid dynasty in 1045, the Kiurikid kingdom became both de jure and de facto independent.

The strengthening of the Georgian kingdom during the reign of Bagrat IV gradually began to turn into a threat to Tashir-Dzoraget. David tried to prevent Bagrat's attempts to unite Georgia, especially since the independence of the kingdom of his son, Gagik, was in danger. For this reason, David and Gagik supported Liparit IV of Kldekari, the most powerful opponent of Bagrat IV, when he opposed the king in the winter of 1046-1047. In the summer of 1047, the combined troops of Liparit, David the Landless and Gagik defeated Bagrat's army in the Battle of Sasireti. This success, however, was only temporary.

After the death of David I in 1048, his son, Kiurike II, ascended to the throne. Under him, a local coin began to be minted in the kingdom.

When the Seljuks invaded the region, the Kiurikids became their vassals, Kiurikie II recognized the suzerainty of the Seljuk sultan Alp-Arslan in 1064/65. In the same 1065, the Georgian king Bagrat IV, under the pretext of negotiating the extradition of his niece, daughter of Kiurikie II (or the daughter of Smbat, brother of Kiurikie II), to Alp-Arslan, seized Kiurikie and his brother Smbat and forced them to surrender Samshvilde, the capital to him. Tashir-Dzoraget and a number of fortresses, which contributed to the sharp weakening of the kingdom. After the loss of Samshvilde, Kiurikie II moved the capital to the city of Lori.

The establishment of relatively peaceful relations with Sultan Alp Arslan allowed Bagrat IV, who invaded the Kingdom of Kakheti-Hereti. The second invasion of the Seljuk Turks against Georgia (1067-1068) occurred while Bagrat was campaigning against Kakheti-Hereti. Upon learning of the invasion of the enemy, he immediately returned to Kartli. During the campaign of Alp Arslan against Bagrat IV, Kiurikie II and his nephew, the king of Kakheti-Hereti Aghsartan I, and the Emir of Tiflis participated on the side of the sultan.

Kiurike II died in 1089 and was succeeded by his sons, Abas and David II. In 1118, the lands of the Tashir-Dzoraget kingdom were annexed to Georgia by David the Builder, after which the Kiurikians, entrenched in the fortresses of Matsnaberd and Tavush, retained their royal title until the beginning of the 13th century.

In 1185, the lands of the Kiurikid kingdom came under the control of the Armenian princes of the Zakarid dynasty.

References

10th century in Armenia
11th century in Armenia
Armenian kingdoms